Porretta Terme is a railway station serving Porretta Terme, part of the municipality of Alto Reno Terme, in the region of Emilia-Romagna, northern Italy. The station is located on the Porrettana railway.

It is the terminus of Line S1A of Bologna metropolitan railway service.

Train services are operated by Trenitalia and Trenitalia Tper.

The station is currently managed by Rete Ferroviaria Italiana (RFI), a subsidiary of Ferrovie dello Stato Italiane (FSI), Italy's state-owned rail company.

History 
As of 1891, the railway station was named "Bagni della Porretta".

On 24 May 1927, the track from Porretta Terme to Pistoia was electrified with three-phase alternating current; on 28 October, the track from Porretta Terme to Bologna followed. The whole Porrettana line was later converted to direct current on 13 May 1935.

Features
The station consists of four tracks linked by an underpass.

Train services

The station is served by the following service(s):

 Suburban services (Treno suburbano) on line S1A, Bologna - Porretta Terme
 Regional services (Treno regionale) Porretta Terme-Pistoia

See also

 List of railway stations in Bologna
 List of railway stations in Emilia-Romagna
 Bologna metropolitan railway service

References 

Railway stations in Emilia-Romagna